Carellina Pieternella (Lina) Spies (born 6 March 1939 in Harrismith, in North-Eastern Free State South Africa) is an Afrikaans poet and academic.

She received both the 1972 Eugène Marais Prize and 1972 Ingrid Jonker Prize, for her first volume of poetry, Digby vergenoeg. Her translation of Anne Frank's diaries was awarded the translation prize by the Suid-Afrikaanse Akademie vir Wetenskap en Kuns (South African Academy of Arts and Sciences).

Spies studied philosophy, languages and literature at Stellenbosch University, the Free University of Amsterdam and the University of Pretoria. She spent most of her career as a university lecturer, variously at the University of Port Elizabeth (now Nelson Mandela Metropolitan University), the University of Pretoria and Stellenbosch University. An authority on the work of Elisabeth Eybers, Martinus Nijhoff, D.J. Opperman and Hennie Aucamp, Spies was Professor of Afrikaans and Dutch Literature at Stellenbosch University between 1987 and her retirement in 1999. She still lives in the town of Stellenbosch.

Volumes of poetry
 Digby Vergenoeg (1971)
 Winterhawe (1973)
 Dagreis (1976)
 Oorstaanson (1982)
 Van sjofar tot sjalom (1987)
 Hiermaals (1992)
 Die skaduwee van die son (1998)
 Duskant die einders (2004)
 Die skyn van tuiskoms (2010) - a selection from the poet's first 8 volumes of poetry, made by the poet Johann de Lange.
 Tydelose gety (2010)
 Sulamiet (2016)

Non-Fiction
 Ontmoetings (1979)
 Kolonnade: ’n Studie van D.J. Opperman se bundels  Heilige Beeste, Negester oor Ninevé en Komas uit ’n Bamboesstok binne verband van sy oeuvre (1992)
 Die enkel taak: Die merkwaardige verwantskap tussen Elisabeth Eybers en Emily Dickinson (1995)

As translator
 Agterhuis: Die dagboek van Anne Frank (2008) (Translation into Afrikaans of Anne Frank's diaries.)
 Tirza (2014) (Translation into Afrikaans of Arnon Grunberg's novel.)

As editor or compiler
 Majesteit, die kat: Verhale en gedigte oor katte (1998) 
 Sy sien webbe roer: 'n Keuse uit die werk van Afrikaanse digteresse (1999) 
 (with Lucas Malan) 'n Skrywer by sonsopkoms: Hennie Aucamp 70 (2004)

References

 Bosman, M.E. (1989) 'Op Hom die Groot Hosannas: Enkele Aspekte van die Moderne Christelike Poësie in Afrikaans' PhD Thesis, Rhodes University. 
 Britz, E.C. (1999) 'Lina Spies', in H.P. van Coller (ed.), Perspektief en Profiel: 'n Afrikaanse Literatuurgeskiedenis, Deel 2 Pretoria: J.L. van Schaik
 Britz, E.C. & van Niekerk, A. (2016) 'Lina Spies', in H.P. van Coller (ed.), Perspektief en Profiel: 'n Afrikaanse Literatuurgeskiedenis, Deel 3 Pretoria: J.L. van Schaik
 Eloff, L. (1984) 'Die Poësie van Lina Spies: 'n Oeuvrestudie' MA Thesis, Potchefstroom University
 Engelbrecht, G.C. (2012) 'Bybelse Intertekste in Resente Afrikaanse Gedigte en Lirieke, met Spesifieke Verwysing na Identiteitsformasies in die (Post-)Postmoderniteit' PhD Thesis, Stellenbosch University
 Kannemeyer, J.C. (1983) Geskiedenis van die Afrikaanse Literatuur, Band 2 Pretoria: H&R-Academica
 Spies, C.M. (2010) 'Die Agterhuis - Lina Spies se Vertaling van Anne Frank se Dagboek, Het Achterhuis, in Afrikaans: Besluite, Benaderings en Strategieë' MPhil Thesis, Stellenbosch University

External links
 Lina Spies (1939 - ) Sanlam ATKV LitNet Afrikaanse Album
 Lina Spies, medewerker van psalmomdigting in die nuwe Liedboek van die NG en NH Kerke, glo nie meer in die goddelikheid van Jesus Christus nie
 Sonja Loots - Lina Spies: ook Afrikaan, postmodernis

South African women poets
Afrikaans-language poets
Afrikaner people
1939 births
Stellenbosch University alumni
Living people
People from Harrismith